The Siamese tigerfish (Datnioides pulcher), also known as the Siamese tiger perch, is a critically endangered Asian fish native to the Chao Phraya, Mae Klong and Mekong basins. It has vertical yellow and black stripes running the length of its body. The dorsal fin has a spiny appearance.

The many species within Datnioides are quite commonly confused. Datnioides pulcher is the Siamese tigerfish, or wide-bar datnoid. Datnioides microlepis is the Indonesian tiger datnoid. Datnioides polota is the silver datnoid.

In the aquarium

It prefers a pH of 7.6–8.0, and a temperature of 22–26 °C (72–79 °F). The Siamese tigerfish is predatory and will eat smaller fish, various live foods, and frozen foods. Many hobbyists pellet-train their datnoids to reduce the risk of disease and parasites from live food. Captive ones are generally smaller than their wild counterparts, though may still require a large aquarium.

Conservation status
D. pulcher is protected in Thailand, and is on the IUCN Red List as critically endangered.

See also
List of brackish aquarium fish species
Brackish-water aquarium

References

Percoidei
Fish described in 1998
Fish of Thailand